A Very Merry Cricket is a 1973 Christmas animated television special. It was directed by Chuck Jones. It originally aired on ABC on December 14, 1973. who also wrote the teleplay with George Selden. It was a sequel to their acclaimed adaptation of the 1960 book The Cricket in Times Square and was followed in 1975 by another sequel, Yankee Doodle Cricket.

The show included two original songs by Dean Elliott and Marian Dern (Jones' wife): "Christmas in New York" and "What If Humans Were More Like Mice?"

Plot
It is Christmastime in New York City, but the loud mean-spiritedness of its human population is making it a misery for best friends, Harry the Cat and Tucker the Mouse. They resolve to try to bring back the holiday's warmth with the help of their friend, Chester C. Cricket, the musical insect. Chester agrees to this idea, but, against this kind of noisy urban negativity, it will take a miracle for this trio to make a difference.

Availability
The special was released on VHS in 1985, in 1989 as part of the Christmas Classics Series, in 1992 on a Double Feature VHS also containing the Canadian Christmas special Bluetoes the Christmas Elf, and in 1999 by Family Home Entertainment. It was released on DVD for the first time with another Chuck Jones special, Mowgli's Brothers in 2005, and later as part of the Chuck Jones Collection DVD in 2007, both released by Lionsgate Home Entertainment.

Cast

References

External links

1973 television specials
1970s American television specials
1970s animated television specials
Television shows directed by Chuck Jones
Santa Claus in film
Santa Claus in television
American animated television films
American children's animated fantasy films
Christmas television specials
Animated films about insects
New York City in fiction
Animated television specials
Animated Christmas television specials
American Broadcasting Company television specials
American Christmas television specials